The Christopher Knoell Farmstead is a historic farm in Dodge County, Nebraska near Fremont, Nebraska. The farmhouse was built in 1888 for Christopher Knoell, and designed in the Italianate architectural style. The barn was built in 1908–1909. The property still belonged to Knoell's heirs in the 1980s. It has been listed on the National Register of Historic Places since January 13, 1983.

References

Farms on the National Register of Historic Places in Nebraska
National Register of Historic Places in Dodge County, Nebraska
Italianate architecture in Nebraska
Houses completed in 1888